The Old Oak and Wormholt estates are London County Council cottage estates constructed between 1912 and 1928. They were declared a conservation area in May 1980. The two estates were influenced by Ebenezer Howard's Garden city movement and the Arts and Crafts movement, which high quality external detailing and an open setting with privet hedges, front gardens and wide grass verges.

Location
The estates are in the London Borough of Hammersmith and Fulham, in the west of London, lying either side of the A40 Westway to the south of Wormwood Scrubs. To the west they are bounded by Old Oak Road and to the east partially by Bloemfontain Road. The southern boundary extends to include Wormholt Park. The London Underground Central line passes through the estates. The station is called East Acton tube station.

History

The Old Oak estate was built in two phases: west of East Acton station and the railway in 1912–13, and east in 1920–23. The final fourteen houses were added in 1927.

The land for the Wormholt Estate was purchased from the same source in 1919. In 1926–28 LCC built 783 houses and Hammersmith Council added 500 houses on the adjoining . Plans for 37 shops were dropped but the Hammersmith Open Air Swimming Pool and Wormholt Park were both constructed.

The estates were designated conservation areas in May 1940. An Article 4 Direction, taking away certain PD Rights (permitted development rights) to preserve aspects of the character of the estate, has been issued.

Design

The estate was designed by the LCC's Architects' Department Housing of the Working Classes branch, particularly A S Soutar, F J Lucas, and J M Corment, using Hampstead Garden Suburb as a reference. The Hampstead Garden Suburb Act 1906 had freed Raymond Unwin, the architect, from the gridiron street pattern imposed by the Public Health Act 1875, and this had been extended to all estates by the Town Planning Act 1909.

The first 304 cottages and five shops were finished January 1914, and the drainage and sewers laid for the rest when the war halted construction.

The cottages were built in small terraces from red brick. They shared a common style but were deliberately different from each other. The Arts and Crafts style was applied to the roofing; which predominantly was red tiles but from different sources to vary the texture. Some roofs used a hand made Belgian peg tile which is very difficult to match when repairs are needed.

The Conservation Areas Design guidelines explain that "privet hedging, grass verges, street trees and the provision of small cottage gardens" and "the widespread use of wooden mullioned window frames (both sash and casement), brick façades, pitched and gabled roofs, small dormers and panelled doors reinforce the cottage character of the estates".

Article 4 Direction
There is requirement to obtain planning consent for proposed changes to:
Roofs – form or materials
Facades – Painting, rendering or cladding – removal or changes to the string courses or arches
Existing rendering – any change of colour
Proposed hardstanding for vehicles
Porches
Gates, Walls and hedges
Extension
Windows – form, colour or material
Doorways
The presumption is always against change.

Trees are protected.

See also
Totterdown Fields

References
Notes

Bibliography

External links
Wormholt Park: the first hundred years

Buildings and structures in the London Borough of Hammersmith and Fulham
Housing estates in London